The chocolate-chip nudibranch, Aphelodoris sp. 1, is an undescribed species of dorid nudibranch as designated by Gosliner, 1987. It is a marine gastropod mollusc in the family Dorididae. As of November 2009, it was undescribed by academics.

Distribution
This species has been found around the southern African coast on both sides of the Cape Peninsula and off Port Elizabeth in 10–35 m of water.

Description
The chocolate-chip nudibranch is a white-bodied smooth-skinned dorid with a few dark blotches of varying sizes on its notum. It has eight gills arranged around the anus and its rhinophores are perfoliate. It may reach a total length of 50 mm.

Ecology
The chocolate-chip nudibranch feeds on sponges. This species is undescribed: it is not yet formally known in the scientific literature.

References

Dorididae
Undescribed gastropod species